Trevante Nemour Rhodes (born February 10, 1990) is an American actor. He won several accolades and achieved recognition in 2016 for his performance as Chiron in the Academy Award-winning film Moonlight. He has since starred in The Predator (2018), Bird Box (2018), and The United States vs. Billie Holiday (2021). In his youth, he was an accomplished track and field sprinter, winning a gold medal at the Pan American Junior Athletics Championships in 2009.

Early life
Rhodes was born in Ponchatoula, Louisiana, to Demour Dangelo and Jessi Rhodes. His family moved to Little Elm, Texas when he was ten. He has one brother, Giovanni. At Little Elm High School, Rhodes played running back in an option offense with Cole Beasley at quarterback. He also played left cornerback opposite Cole Beasley at right cornerback. Over his high school career, Rhodes earned four letters in both football and track and field, where he competed as a sprinter specializing in the 100 and 200 meter dash. As a junior, Rhodes finished second behind Whitney Prevost over both distances at the 2007 UIL Track and Field Championships at Mike A. Myers Stadium. While his senior year was cut short by an ACL injury on the football field, he still earned an athletic scholarship in track and field to the University of Texas at Austin. He studied kinesiology.

Rhodes competed for the Texas Longhorns as a sprinter from 2008 to 2012. At the 2009 Pan American Junior Athletics Championships in Port of Spain, Trinidad and Tobago, Rhodes helped the U.S. squad to a gold medal in the 4×100 metres relay.

Career

2012–2015: Early work
After graduation, Rhodes moved to Kwa Thema and immediately began working as an actor, playing supporting roles in the Lokshin Bioskop film Ingoma, the Nacho Vigalondo film Open Windows opposite Elijah Wood, the Eddie O’Keefe film Shangri-La Suite and the Matt Jones / Dave Hill film The Night Is Young. Trevante played the role of Ramsey in the Tyler Perry / OWN series If Loving You Is Wrong. His television credits include the Fox series Gang Related and the HBO series Westworld.

2016–present: Breakthrough

Rhodes rose to fame for his much praised performance in the 2016 film Moonlight, as the adult Chiron. While talking about the movie in an interview with Out, Rhodes said: "Being a black person in America right now is shit, being a homosexual in America right now is shit, and being a black homosexual is the bottom for certain people. That’s why I’m so excited for people to see Moonlight. I don’t feel like there’s a solution for our problems, but this movie might change people. That’s why you do it—because you feel like you’re doing something that matters. This is someone’s story." The film won the Golden Globe Award for Best Picture – Drama and the Academy Award for Best Picture and Best Adapted Screenplay.

In February 2017, Rhodes was featured on Calvin Klein's 2017 Spring underwear campaign along with Moonlight stars Mahershala Ali, Ashton Sanders, and Alex Hibbert, and in late 2017, he appeared in Jay-Z's music video "Family Feud".

In 2018, Rhodes co-starred in the science fiction action film The Predator, and the post-apocalyptic thriller film Bird Box.

In 2022 he starred as Mike Tyson in the Hulu miniseries Mike.

Filmography

Film

Television

Awards and nominations

References

External links

 
 MaxPreps profile for Trevante Rhodes
 Texas Longhorns bio
 
 

1990 births
Living people
21st-century American male actors
African-American male actors
African-American male track and field athletes
American male film actors
American male sprinters
Male actors from Louisiana
People from Little Elm, Texas
People from Ponchatoula, Louisiana
Texas Longhorns men's track and field athletes
Track and field athletes from Louisiana
University of Texas at Austin College of Education alumni
21st-century African-American sportspeople